Timor Air was an airline launched in partnership with Vincent Aviation in July 2011. It was the proposed flag carrier airline of East Timor (Timor-Leste).

History
An agreement was signed with Brisbane, Australia-based airline SkyAirWorld on 27 November 2008 to establish the airline using an Embraer ERJ-190 belonging to SkyAirWorld, and taking advantage of SkyAirWorld's management expertise. However, SkyAirWorld ceased operations in March 2009. Timor Air's founder Jeremias Desousa gave the government of Timor-Leste a 10% share in the new airline.

In April 2012, the airline signed a memorandum of understanding (MoU) with AvCon Worldwide Limited, a London, UK based aviation consulting firm, and appointed managing director of AvCon Worldwide Limited, James Stewart Kim as its new CEO.

In May 2012, the airline ceased Saab 340 operations on the Dili-Darwin route due to low patronage. The same month, the airline signed an MoU with an undisclosed operator to serve the Dili-Darwin route with jet equipment, and to commence services on other routes under its plan.

Destinations
Plans were to initially fly daily services from Dili's Presidente Nicolau Lobato International Airport to the island of Bali, Indonesia; and to Darwin, Australia; with services to commence on 2 February 2009. Additional routes were expected to be added during 2009, but none came about.

However a daily service from Dili to Darwin International Airport finally commenced 26 July 2011.

Fleet
At March 2012 Timor Air had one SAAB 340B, operated by Vincent Aviation

Demise
In May 2012, Timor Air stopped flights, saying it did not have enough passengers.

See also

 Vincent Aviation
 List of Airlines
 List of defunct airlines of East Timor

References

Airlines established in 2011
Airlines disestablished in 2012
Defunct airlines of East Timor
2011 establishments in East Timor
2012 disestablishments in Asia